Port Authority of Thailand Stadium, simply known as PAT Stadium is a stadium in the Khlong Toei District of central Bangkok, Thailand.  It is currently used for football matches and is the home stadium of Port F.C. The stadium holds approximately 12,000 spectators divided into four stands labelled A to D and is the subject of a popular chant by Port fans: "This is Khlong Toei - this is the away team's hell".

History 
Located in Khlong Toei District, the stadium was completed in 1967 and since then has undergone three renovations in 2009, 2011 and 2020.

Gallery

References

Sports venues in Bangkok
Football venues in Thailand
Khlong Toei district